William Franke may refer to:

William B. Franke, United States Secretary of the Navy, 1959–1961
William Franke (philosopher), professor of philosophy and religions at the University of Macau and professor of comparative literature at Vanderbilt University
Bill Franke (William A. Franke), chairman of Wizz Air and Frontier Airlines